Leewan Castanha (born 15 April 2003) is an Indian professional footballer who plays as a defender for Indian Arrows, on loan from Indian Super League club Goa.

Career
Leewan Castanha made up his first professional appearance for Indian Arrows on 10 January 2021 against Churchill Brothers.

Career statistics

Club

References

2003 births
Living people
Indian footballers
Indian Arrows players
I-League players
Association football defenders
Footballers from Goa